Radio Colony Model School and College (RCMSC) is a state-run secondary and higher secondary school located in Savar Upazila, Dhaka District, Bangladesh. It is situated along the Dhaka-Aricha Highway. Its EIIN is 108411.

History 
The school was established in 1989. In 2022 the school was raised to the status of a college.

Structure 
The school enrolls students from class (grade) 1 to 12. It also has play and nursery grades. The school operates in two shifts: morning and day.  Each section has average 60-80 students. Every year more than 400 students appear in the Higher Secondary School Certificate (HSC), Secondary School Certificate (SSC), Junior School Certificate (JSC) and Primary Education Certificate (PEC) examinations, with about half in the science group, and the rest from the commerce and humanities groups.

Extracurricular activities 
The students of RCMS are active in sports. The annual sports competition is organized by the school authority. Sprints (100 to 400 meters), long jump, and high jump are few to mention among different kinds of sports in which students participate.

See also 
 Savar Cantonment Public School and College
 BPATC School and College
 Jahangirnagar University School & College
 Morning Glory School and College

References 

 Teachers List

External links
 

High schools in Bangladesh
Schools in Dhaka District